Palatine station is a commuter railroad station on Metra's Union Pacific Northwest Line in the village of Palatine, Illinois. It is officially located at 137 West Wood Street, however there are parking lots for the station scattered within its vicinity, such as those on Smith Street, Colfax Street, Brockway Street, Slade Street, Railroad Avenue, and Palatine Road. Palatine is the outermost station on the UP-NW line to have three tracks, serviced by two platforms. Inbound trains are serviced by the north side platform nearest the station, with outbound and center track express trains serviced by the south island platform. Due to the Northwest Line's schedule, it is common to see an outbound train and an inbound train arriving at the same time, as Palatine is the halfway point between Ogilvie and Harvard.

As of May 31, 2022, Palatine is served by 62 trains (31 in each direction) on weekdays, by 33 trains (16 inbound, all 17 outbound) on Saturdays, and by 20 trains (nine inbound, all 11 outbound) on Sundays.

On weekdays, two inbound trains originate, and three outbound trains terminate, at Palatine.

History
The original Palatine train station was a Chicago and North Western Railway structure, located between Plum Grove Road and Bothwell Street north of the tracks until 1971 when a station with an attached strip mall and restaurant was built across Smith Street from the present station. Today's station was built by DLK Civic Design, an architecture firm based in Chicago, in 2001. It contains a clock tower and an outdoor Starbucks café, a pedestrian concourse, and decorative canopies, as well as concession facilities.  The original station site has been replaced by a mixed condominium/business complex while the 1971-2001 site was razed to make way for a parking garage, an office building, and a new location for the Durty Nellie's restaurant and nightclub.

Until it was discontinued on February 8, 2010, Pace route 699 offered northbound service to northeast Palatine and southbound service to Harper College, the Woodfield Mall area in Schaumburg, Alexian Brothers Medical Center, and Elk Crossing Shopping Center, the latter two in Elk Grove Village.

References

External links

Metra - Palatine Station 
Palatine Metra Station (DLK Civic Design)
Station from Smith Street from Google Maps Street View

Palatine (Metra)
Metra Station
Railway stations in the United States opened in 2001
Former Chicago and North Western Railway stations
Railway stations in Cook County, Illinois